Verdun station is a Montreal Metro station in the borough of Verdun in Montreal, Quebec, Canada. It is operated by the Société de transport de Montréal (STM) and serves the Green Line. It opened on September 3, 1978, as part of the extension of the Green Line westward to Angrignon station.

Architecture and art 

Designed by Jean-Maurice Dubé, it is a normal side platform station, built in a deep open cut necessitated by the surrounding Utica shale formation. The ticket hall is located at transept level, and both the mezzanine and platforms are surmounted by high volumes. The volume over the tracks and platforms has a forced perspective; the ceiling lowers and the platform width shortens on the western end of the station. Accesses are located on either side of rue de Verdun.

The artwork running throughout the station consists of concrete walls with bas-reliefs in the upper parts and painted motifs on the lower, which were designed by Claude Théberge and Antoine D. Lamarche.

Origin of the name
This station is named for rue de Verdun and for the borough (formerly the city) of Verdun, in front of whose borough office the station is located. The land that would later constitute the borough was granted as a concession to Zacharie Dupuis in 1671; he named it Fief-de-Verdun for his birthplace at Saverdun in the south of France.

Connecting bus routes

Nearby points of interest
Verdun borough office
Régie du logement
Centre communautaire Marcel-Giroux
St. Willibrord Hospitality Centre

References

External links
Verdun Metro Station— Official site
Montreal by Metro, metrodemontreal.com — Photos, information, and trivia
 2011 STM System Map

Green Line (Montreal Metro)
Railway stations in Canada opened in 1978
Verdun, Quebec